Evergreen Valley may refer to:

Evergreen Valley College, a community college in San Jose, California, U.S.
Evergreen Valley High School, San Jose, California, U.S.